Riska Aprilia (born 19 April 1999) is an Indonesian footballer who plays a goalkeeper for PSS Putri and the Indonesia women's national team.

Club career
Aprilia has played for PSS Putri in Indonesia.

International career 
Aprilia represented Indonesia at the 2022 AFC Women's Asian Cup.

References

External links

1999 births
Living people
People from Magelang
Sportspeople from Central Java
Indonesian women's footballers
Women's association football goalkeepers
Indonesia women's international footballers